M.P. George was the Kerala state President of Indian Federal Democratic Party (IFDP). He is leading a splinter faction of IFDP. When P. C. Thomas merge IFDP with Kerala Congress (Joseph), M. P. George retained IFDP. In 2014, with an aim for Nationalism, Federalism and Socialism, IFDP (M. P. George) merged with All India Forward Bloc.

Later he split from AIFB and formed Forward Bloc Secular, which later merged in All India Federal Bloc.

References

Living people
Kerala local politicians
Year of birth missing (living people)
Place of birth missing (living people)